The La Grande-1 (LG-1) is a hydroelectric power station on the La Grande River that is part of Hydro-Québec's James Bay Project. The station can generate 1,436 MW and was commissioned in 1994–1995. A run of the river generating station, it is one of only two generating stations of the James Bay Project that use a reservoir without any major water-level fluctuations (the Laforge-2 generating station is the other). Thus, the amount of electricity generated by the station depends almost entirely on the water-flow of the river, which is largely controlled by upstream reservoirs and generating stations.


See also 

 List of largest power stations in Canada
 List of electrical generating stations in Quebec
 Reservoirs and dams in Canada
 Hydro-Québec
 James Bay Project
 Chisasibi, Quebec

References

Further reading

External links 
 LG-1 and The Grand River (YouTube Video)

Dams completed in 1995
Energy infrastructure completed in 1995
James Bay Project
Dams in Quebec
Run-of-the-river power stations
Dams on the La Grande River
Publicly owned dams in Canada